Arnold Luger was an Italian luger who competed during the 1980s. A natural track luger, he won two medals in the men's doubles event at the FIL European Luge Natural Track Championships with a gold in 1989 and a bronze in 1987.

References
Natural track European Championships results 1970-2006.

Italian lugers
Italian male lugers
Living people
Year of birth missing (living people)
Sportspeople from Südtirol